Black Oak Conspiracy is a 1977 American action film directed by Bob Kelljan and written by Hugh Smith. The film stars Jesse Vint, Karen Carlson, Albert Salmi, Seymour Cassel, Douglas Fowley and Robert F. Lyons. The film was released on April 20, 1977, by New World Pictures.

Plot
Hollywood stuntman Jingo Johnson returns to his rural hometown of Black Oak to visit his seriously ill mother who is being cared for at a nursing home. He discovers that a mining company has bought his mother's farm and his childhood home. He also learns that his former girlfriend Lucy is now involved with Harrison Hancock, who works for the mining company. After breaking into the farm with Lucy's brother Homer, Jingo finds the farm has been demolished. He is confronted by Hancock and his men. A fight ensues and Jingo is told to leave by the Sheriff, Otis Grimes, who does not like Jingo and begins surveillance on him.

Jingo tries to reconcile with Lucy, who dreams of escaping her small-town existence and does not want to renew their relationship. He learns that the farm was bought by the nursing home, which is owned by Hancock's father, and that two other local landowners are also patients there. Jingo finds out that Sheriff Grimes is particularly interested if Jingo makes contact with his mother's nurse Beulah Barnes or Doctor Roades. He obtains some of his mother's pills from the nursing home and, after visiting Roades to find out what they are, he is attacked by Harrison Hancock and told to stop snooping around.

Jingo later confronts Harrison on his own and finds that Hancock senior wants him to leave town. He meets Lucy again and they leave together, spending the night in a barn. After his mother dies, Jingo discovers that the pills, supposedly antibiotics prescribes by Dr Roades, actually caused his mother's blood disease. The nursing home is at the center of Hancock senior and Grimes's plan to obtain land by killing off the owners. Grimes tells Hancock that he plans to kill the nurse and doctor and frame Jingo for their murders. When Hancock protests Grimes kills him, and then Harrison. Nurse Barnes witnesses the killings and raises the alarm. Jingo finds Grimes at the mine workings, and, after an extended confrontation, Jingo prevails and Sheriff Grimes is arrested. Jingo leaves town with Lucy to return to Hollywood.

Cast    
Jesse Vint as Jingo Johnson
Karen Carlson as Lucy Metcalf
Albert Salmi as Sheriff Grimes
Seymour Cassel as Homer Metcalf
Douglas Fowley as Bryan Hancock 
Robert F. Lyons as Harrison Hancock
Mary Charlotte Wilcox as Beulah Barnes 
Janus Blythe as Melba Barnes
Jeremy Foster as Billie Bob
Peggy Stewart as Virginia Metcalf
Joanne Strauss as Sadie Grimes
Vic Perrin as Mr. Finch
Darby Hinton as Miner at cafe
Dana Derfus as Miner
Rock A. Walker as Policeman 
Buff Brady as Policeman
Stephanie Pineo as Kazoo Band Leader

References

External links
 

1977 films
American action films
1977 action films
New World Pictures films
Films directed by Bob Kelljan
1970s English-language films
1970s American films